Because of the Cats, released theatrically in the UK as The Rape,  is a 1973 Dutch-Belgian drama film directed by Fons Rademakers and starring Bryan Marshall, Alexandra Stewart, Sylvia Kristel and Sebastian Graham Jones.

The film's Dutch title was Niet voor de poezen. It was based on a novel by Nicolas Freeling in the Van der Valk series.

Plot
In Amsterdam, Inspector Van der Valk is on the trail of a group of wealthy young men who go round attacking women for entertainment.

Cast
 Bryan Marshall ...  Inspector van der Valk
 Alexandra Stewart ...  Feodora
 Sebastian Graham Jones ...  Jansen
 Anthony Allen ...  Erik Mierle
 Ida Goemans ...  Carmen
 Nicholas Hoye ...  Kees van Sonneveld
 Sylvia Kristel ...  Hannie Troost
 Delia Lindsay ...  Ms. Maris
 Edward Judd ...  Mierle
 Roger Hammond ...  Maris
 Derek Hart ...  Kieft
 Guido de Moor ...  Marcousis
 Lous Hensen ...  Mevr. Van Sonneveld
 George Baker ...  Boersma
 Liliane Vincent ...  Mevrouw Kieft

References

External links

1973 films
1973 crime drama films
Dutch crime drama films
English-language Belgian films
English-language Dutch films
Films directed by Fons Rademakers
Rape and revenge films
Belgian crime drama films
Films based on British novels